Risoba prominens is a species of moth of the family Nolidae first described by Frederic Moore in 1881. It is found in India, Sri Lanka, Taiwan, Japan, Vietnam and Sundaland.

The larvae have been recorded feeding on Pterocarya, Melastoma, Myrica and Quisqualis species.

References

Moths described in 1881
Nolidae
Moths of Japan